Laurent Pascal Chambon Guéguen (born 22 May 1972) is a French sociologist and politicologist who has resided in Amsterdam since 1998. A specialist of the question of minorities in politics, he was elected in the borough of Amsterdam Oud-Zuid for the Labour Party (PvdA) from March 2006 to May 2010. Chambon was the only non-Dutch European politician in the Netherlands at the time. He is a native of Châtenay-Malabry, south-southwest of Paris.

Co-founder of the minority-related website Minorités, he is a visible figure, as a sociologist and former politician, in French media to discuss the Netherlands, as well as in the Dutch media to discuss France. He was a correspondent for French-speaking media in the Netherlands (particularly Têtu and Libération).

A doctor (PhD) in political science and a former pupil at the Lycée Lakanal, he is also a producer for Cherry Juice Recordings and a musician as Laurent Outang, one half of Laurent & Lewis. After having taught French and political science at the Hyperion Lyceum in Amsterdam, he now teaches at the Lyceum Rotterdam. Chambon is member of the antiracist party BIJ1 and the antispecist party Party for the Animals (PvdD). He is also a member of the AOb and Teachers in action (Leraren in actie) trade unions.

Works
 Le sel de la démocratie, l'accès des minorités au pouvoir politique en France et aux Pays-Bas (The Salt of Democracy, Minority Access to Political Power in France and the Netherlands), University of Amsterdam, 2002.
 Le grand mélange, Minorités, tolérance et faux-semblants dans la France de Nicolas Sarkozy, Éditions Denoël, Paris, April 2008.
 Überlove, Laurent & Lewis, Cherry Juice Recordings, May 2008 (CD).
 Marine ne perd pas le Nord, Éditions Le Muscadier, Paris, March 2012.
 Machine à danser, Laurent Outang, Testlab, June 2017.
 This Pill, The Uglicians, Cherry Juice Recordings, July 2019.

References

External links 
 Minorités.org (collective site)
 Laurent & Lewis (music)
 Discogs: Laurent Chambon

1972 births
Living people
French expatriates in the Netherlands
French sociologists
French male writers
People from Châtenay-Malabry
University of Amsterdam alumni